{{Album ratings
| ADM = 6.6/10
| MC = 75/100
| rev1 = The 405
| rev1score = 6.5/10
| rev2 = AllMusic
| rev2score = 
| rev3 = The A.V. Club
| rev3score = B−
| rev4 = The Guardian
| rev4score = 
| rev5 = HipHopDX
| rev5score = 4.3/5
| rev6 = NME
| rev6score = 
| rev7 = Pitchfork| rev7score = 6.4/10
| rev8 = RapReviews| rev8score = 8.5/10
| rev9 = Vice (Expert Witness)
| rev9score = 
}}Czarface Meets Metal Face is the first collaborative album by American hip hop supergroup Czarface and British-American rapper MF Doom. It was released on March 30, 2018 through Get On Down, a Boston-based record label. The album features guest appearances from Vinnie Paz, Open Mike Eagle, Blacastan and Kendra Morris. It was the last release by MF Doom before his death on October 31, 2020.

The two previously collaborated on the song "Ka-Bang!" on Czarface's 2015 album Every Hero Needs a Villain, and 2017's First Weapon Drawn.

 Reception Czarface Meets Metal Face'' received generally favourable reviews upon its release. At Metacritic, which assigns a normalized rating out of 100 to reviews from mainstream critics, the album has received an average score of 75, based on 9 reviews, indicating "generally favourable reviews".

Track listing

Personnel
Credits adapted from the album's liner notes.

Musicians

 Inspectah Deck – vocals, composer 
 Esoteric – vocals, composer 
 MF Doom – vocals, composer 
 Blacastan – rude boy vocals 
 Godforbid – mask specialist 
 Yuki Kanesaka – interlude keys
 Josh Mac – vocals 
 Sam Merrick – drums 
 Kendra Morris – vocals 
 Open Mike Eagle – featured vocals 
 Vinnie Paz – featured vocals 
 Morgan Price – flute , saxophone 
 Joe Stratton – vocals 

Production
 The Czar-Keys – production 
 Caserta – audio mixing 
 7L – vocal engineering 
 Esoteric – vocal engineering 
 Jason Bitner – vocal engineering 
 Adam J. Brass – vocal engineering 

Design
 Lamour Supreme – cover art
 Alfredo Rico-Dimas – layout and design

Charts

Notes

References

External links

2018 albums
MF Doom albums
Czarface albums
7L & Esoteric albums
Collaborative albums
Inspectah Deck albums